Christmas Cheer or variants may refer to:

Film and TV
 "Christmas Cheers", an episode of Cheers

Music
 Christmas Cheer, a 1996 album by Ken Navarro
 Christmas Cheer, a 2008 album by The Boxmasters
 "Christmas Cheer (Everything's Going to be Alright)", a song by Strawbs from album The Broken Hearted Bride
 Christmas Cheers, a 2009 album by Straight No Chaser

See also
 "Saucy Limericks & Christmas Cheer", a poem by Kenneth Rexroth